David Albert "Dave" Cannon (born 7 August 1950) is a retired male long-distance runner from England, who competed in the late 1970s and early 1980s in the men's marathon. He won the 1981 edition of the Paris Marathon ex-æquo with USA's Ron Tabb.

Earlier in his running career, Cannon had been a successful fell runner, his many victories including several wins in the Ben Nevis Race. He was the British Fell Running Champion in 1972. Later, he guided Kenny Stuart in the latter's transition from the fells to road running.

Marathons

References

External links
ARRS
aucklandmarathon
gbrathletics

1950 births
Living people
English male marathon runners
Paris Marathon male winners
British fell runners